Paramananda is a compound Sanskrit word composed of two words, Parama and Ānanda. Parma is usually taken to mean the Highest, the utmost or the most excellent, but actually means - "beyond". And Ānanda, which means, happiness and bliss and most often used to refer to joy though it does not exactly mean these because the original meaning implies permanence rather than just a momentary surge of delight or happiness; it also suggests a deep-seated spiritual emotion that is solidly entrenched. The Upanishadic Seers have used the word, Ānanda, to denote Brahman, the limitless, formless, infinite, indestructible, sole eternal Supreme Being or Sole Reality, to mean, Brahmanmayah, i.e. full of Brahman.

Jivanmukti
Joy, Happiness or Bliss, which is one of the four moral ends towards which human beings always direct all their efforts, is derived via decidedly good thoughts and good deeds that depend on the state and on the control of the mind, which means, depending on the evenness of one’s own temper or in other words, through the practice of equanimity in the performance of every act without becoming instrumental in making those actions bear fruit ; the state of supreme bliss is reached through evenness of the mind with reference to all aspects of one’s life. The Bhagvad Gita, by using five verbs viz. करोषि Karoshi (ordinary activities carried on for earning a livelihood, social duties etc.;), अश्नासि Ashnaasi (activities intended to keep the body and soul together by intake of food etc.;), जुहोषि Juhoshi (activities connected with worship, meditation etc.;), ददासि Dadaasi (activities connected with charity etc.;) and तपस्यसि Tapasyasi (activities which bring about self-restraint, all forms of austere penance etc.;), does enumerate those actions with which the ordinary man identifies himself with, attaches to and craves for their fruits, the practice of equanimity includes shunning of this wrong identification, attachment and craving.  A person experiences delight which follows from the contact of the senses with their objects of enjoyments, and there is also enjoyment derived through practice of adoration, meditation, etc.; whereby end of sorrow is reached. But even this is not the state of supreme or true happiness. Both, the Physical good and the Spiritual good, result in bliss; whereas the former by itself is an aspect of bliss, the latter constitutes the acme of bliss. According to the Vedanta school of Hindu philosophy, Ānanda is that state of sublime delight when the Jiva, the individual empirical self, becomes free from all sins, all doubts, all desires, all actions, all pains, all sufferings and also all physical and mental ordinary pleasures, having become established in Brahman, the eternal Universal Self and the subtle essence underlying all existence, it becomes Jivanmukta, it becomes liberated.

Experience with self-realisation
The sage of the Rig veda of the Sukta 10.109 reminds us that since "speech" in its undifferentiated state serves no purpose in the performance of the yagnas meant to invoke the gods who were amongst the first-born, this dosha of speech is required to be removed by making it differentiated i.e. recognisable and understandable, existence has come to being through part differentiation of the Undifferentiated in order to experience both, the differentiated and the undifferentiated. Parashara does not imply rebirth of the liberated souls for in his Mantra R.V.1.72.2 he uses the word, amritaah, to mean the uncreated eternal state, and the phrase, pade parame, to refer to the most exalted state of perfect unity with the Undifferentiated Universal Consciousness from which point of journey there is no return – Anaavrttiah shabadaata (Brahma Sutra 4.4.22). Even though Vakya Vritti Sl.53. explains that Kaivalya is the final destination of evolution reaching which destination one gains the state of Absolute Oneness with the Divine, and by knowing one’s own true essence enjoys endless immeasurable bliss called Padamapada Yama tells Naciketa that whereas Mind is Buddhi, above the Buddhi is the Mahat Atman, above the Mahat Atman is the Avyakta and above that is the Purusha, but above the Purusha there is nothing else (Katha Upanishad I.3.10-11) and Krishna tells Arjuna that even though all embodied beings emanate from the Unmanifest only to ultimately merge into that very Unmanifest - But far beyond even this Unmanifest there is yet another external Unmanifest Existence, that Supreme Divine Being who does not perish even when all things perish. Bhagavad Gita VIII. There is nothing else  whatsoever because " the constituents that spring from ignorance can have no remnant after their resorption through knowledge." – Adi Shankara And, even otherwise the Jiva is certainly a false appearance for it is merely a reflection of the supreme Self (Brahma Sutra II.iii.50) which reflection is removed through Self-realisation alone.

To know that the Self already stands realised is not at all difficult for one becomes aware of Self-realisation at once with the dawn of the knowledge of the highest. But knowing this much and that too without experiencing the spiritual progress and the ecstasy in knowing it, is like not knowing the Self, it is like not knowing what purity actually means. In that state of realisation all finite ideas cease, the man of realisation simply exists as the Self who is the Eternal Bliss, and as the eternal subject distinct from all other objects. Hence, there is the experience of Paramananda to be gained as being distinct from Ānanda.

Self-realisation
Ramachandra Dattatrya Ranade states that the bliss of Self-realisation is experienced only when the Self is made to stand in its native purity and grandeur and it is implied that the Self is the sole object of desire, but he warns that the word Self or Atman should not be interpreted in an egoistic sense. While enjoying the bliss of Self-realisation one sees his own form in a flood of supreme light arising from within himself. The unique awareness of Sameness, which is actually the awareness of Oneness, is the knowledge of Reality, which is Bliss, and the sole source of bliss. The bliss of Self-realisation is Paramananda. It is the experience gained by reaching out to the more sublime regions that lie beyond Avyakta, the Undifferentiated, to those regions where duality cannot and does not exist. As the knower of knowledge of the Vedas (man of knowledge) has no desire for all those coveted pleasures, the bliss of all creatures is his (Panchadasi XIV-34). Neither in Rajasika nor in Tamasika Vrittis the experience of Sukha (absolute bliss) is seen but in Sattvika Vrittis experience of "Absolute happiness" is seen to a greater or a lesser degree (Panchadasi XV-13). Whatever is experienced it is Brahman alone because it is a reflection of Brahman, when the Vritti is directed inward or is withdrawn, the reflection of Paramananda is unobstructed (Panchadasi XV-19). Adi Shankara in his commentary on Brahma Sutra III.iii.41 explains that the fact that Vamadeva while realizing this (Self) as That (Brahman) knew " I was Manu, and the sun " shows the result of knowledge, consisting in becoming identified with all, occurs simultaneously with the rise of complete illumination, hence liberation comes inevitably to a man of knowledge. And then, the stage - "avibhaagen drshtatvaata" (Brahma Sutra IV.iv.4) is reached, in liberation the soul exists in a state of inseparableness from the supreme Self, and the liberated soul "established in Infinity on Its own majesty delights in his own Self and disports in his own Self" (Chandogya Upanishad VII.xxv.2), "in that state which the knowers of Brahman call the highest the five senses of knowledge come to rest together with the mind weaned away from its functions of thinking etc;, and the intellect characterised by determination too does not function" (Katha Upanishad II.iii.10).

Rishi Bandhvaduya Gopayanah (Rig Veda10.60.8) reminds that the mind is kept bound to the Jivatman not for the destruction of Prana and its associated aspects but for their protection, for on them depends life. But it is also true that the apparent universe having its roots in the mind does not persist after the mind is annihilated. The mind is annihilated when it is brought to concentrate on the Self with the view to transcend the whole objective universe in search of the identity of the Jiva and Brahman leading to Self-realisation and the consequent parallel enjoyment of eternal bliss, Parmananda .

References

Vedanta
Sanskrit words and phrases